Mount Sequoyah is a mountain in the Great Smoky Mountains, located in 
the Southeastern United States. While 
the Appalachian Trail crosses its summit, Sequoyah is an  hike from 
the nearest parking lot, making it one of the most remote places in the Great Smoky Mountains National Park.

The Tennessee-North Carolina border traverses Mount Sequoyah, with Sevier County to the north and Swain County to the south. The mountain consists of four small peaks, with the easternmost being the true (highest) summit. Part of the headwaters of the Little Pigeon accumulate along Sequoyah's northern slope.

Mount Sequoyah is named after the inventor of the Cherokee alphabet. While it's doubtful that Sequoyah ever visited the mountain, numerous Cherokee villages dotted the base of the southeastern Smokies when European settlers arrived in the early 18th century. Arnold Guyot crossed Mount Sequoyah on his survey of the Smokies crest in the late 1850s. The mountain rarely saw a human presence until a segment of the Appalachian Trail was constructed across its summit in 1935.

The summit of Mount Sequoyah is among the most distant summits traversed by a trail in the Great Smokies. From the Cosby Campground, Sequoyah can be reached by following the Snake Den Ridge Trail  to its junction with the Appalachian Trail, and then following the latter  to Tricorner Knob, crossing Old Black and Mount Guyot along the way.

References

External links
Great Smoky Mountains National Park Trail Map - .pdf format
Mount Sequoyah - Peakbagger.com 
The Southern Sixers - SummitPost.org 
South Beyond 6000 in the Smokies - Challenge sponsored by the Carolina Hiking Club and the Tennessee Eastman Hiking and Canoeing Club

Mountains of Great Smoky Mountains National Park
Mountains on the Appalachian Trail
Southern Sixers
Mountains of North Carolina
Mountains of Tennessee
Protected areas of Sevier County, Tennessee
Protected areas of Swain County, North Carolina
Mountains of Swain County, North Carolina
Mountains of Sevier County, Tennessee